The Primetime Emmy Award for Outstanding Commercial is awarded to one advertisement each year.

In the following list, the first titles listed in gold are the winners; those not in gold are nominees, which are listed in alphabetical order. The years given are those in which the ceremonies took place:

Winners and nominations

1990s

2000s

2010s

2020s

References

Commercial